Annemarie Schimmel (7 April 1922 – 26 January 2003) was an influential German Orientalist and scholar who wrote extensively on Islam, especially Sufism.  She was a professor at Harvard University from 1967 to 1992.

Early life and education

Schimmel was born to Protestant and highly cultured middle-class parents in Erfurt, Germany. Her father Paul was a postal worker and her mother Anna belonged to a family with connections to seafaring and international trade. Schimmel remembered her father as "a wonderful playmate, full of fun," and she recalled that her mother made her feel that she was the child of her dreams. She also remembered her childhood home as being full of poetry and literature, though her family was not an academic one.

Having finished high school at age 15, she worked voluntarily for half a year in the Reichsarbeitsdienst (Reich Labor Service). She then began studying at the University of Berlin in 1939, at the age of 17, during the Third Reich (1933–1945), the period of Nazi domination in Europe. At the university, she was deeply influenced by her teacher Hans Heinrich Schaeder, who suggested that she study the Divan of Shams Tabrisi, one of the major works of Jalaluddin Rumi. In November 1941 she received a doctorate with the thesis Die Stellung des Kalifen und der Qadis im spätmittelalterlichen Ägypten (The Position of the Caliph and the Qadi in Late Medieval Egypt). She was then only 19 years old and her thesis was awarded magna cum laude. Not long after, she was drafted by the Auswärtiges Amt (German Foreign Office), where she worked for the next few years while continuing her scholarly studies in her free time. After the end of World War II in Europe, in May 1945, she was detained for several months by U.S. authorities for investigation of her activities as a German foreign service worker, but she was cleared of any suspicion of collaboration with the Nazis. In 1946, at the age of 23, she became a professor of Arabic and Islamic studies at the University of Marburg, Germany. She was married briefly in the 1950s, but domestic life did not suit her, and she soon returned to her scholarly studies. She earned a second doctorate at Marburg in the history of religions (Religionswissenschaft) in 1954.

Later life and scholarly career

In Turkey (Ankara University, 1954–1967)
A turning point in Schimmel's life came in 1954 when she was appointed professor of the history of religion at Ankara University. She spent five years in the capital city of Turkey teaching in Turkish and immersing herself in the culture and mystical tradition of the country. She was the first woman and the first non-Muslim to teach theology at the university.

Harvard University (1967–1992)
In 1967 she inaugurated the Indo-Muslim studies program at Harvard University and remained on the faculty there for the next twenty-five years. While living in quarters on the Harvard campus, Schimmel often visited New York City, where, as a consultant at the Metropolitan Museum of Art, she was famed for her ability to date manuscripts and objects from the style of calligraphy in or on them. Her memory of calligraphic styles was almost photographic.

During the 1980s, she served on the editorial board of the Encyclopedia of Religion, published in 16 volumes (Macmillan, 1988) under the aegis of Mircea Eliade.

In 1992, upon her retirement from Harvard, she was named Professor Emerita of Indo-Muslim Culture. During this period, she was also an honorary professor at the University of Bonn.

Back in Germany (1992–2003)
After leaving Harvard, she returned to Germany, where she lived in Bonn until her death in 2003.

Religion
She was often asked by both Muslims and non-Muslims alike whether she was a Muslim or not. In such cases, she preferred to give an evasive answer, saying, for example, that only those who are not sure whether they are good Muslims or not can really be good Muslims.

Languages, interests and expertise
She was multilingual—besides German, English, and Turkish, she spoke Arabic, Persian, Urdu, and Punjabi—and her interests ranged across the Muslim landscape. She published more than fifty books and hundreds of articles on Islamic literature, mysticism, and culture, and she translated Persian, Urdu, Arabic, Sindhi, and Turkish poetry and literature into English and German. Her particular fondness for cats led her to write a book about their role in Islamic literature, and her interest in mysticism resulted in a book about numerical symbolism in various cultures. Her consuming passion, however, was Sufism, the mystical branch of Islam. Even prominent Sufis acknowledged her as one of the foremost experts on their history and tradition.

Schimmel was the cofounder of Fikrun wa Fann, a multilingual cultural magazine.

Awards and honors

For her works on Islam, Sufism, and Muhammad Iqbal, a prominent philosopher and national poet of Pakistan, the government of Pakistan honored Schimmel with its highest civil awards, 
Sitara-e-Imtiaz, or Star of Excellence, by Government of Pakistan
Hilal-e-Imtiaz, or Crescent of Excellence, by Government of Pakistan

She was given other awards from many countries of the world, including the 1995 prestigious Peace Prize of the German Book Trade. This award caused a controversy in Germany, as she had defended the outrage of the Islamic world against Salman Rushdie, author of The Satanic Verses (1988), a novel, in a television interview. Schimmel's award speech is available online in translation, entitled "A Good Word Is Like a Good Tree."

Among other awards and honors are the following.
  1965  Friedrich Rückert Prize of the City of Schweinfurt, Germany
  1978  Foreign member of the Royal Netherlands Academy of Arts and Sciences
  1980  Johann Heinrich Voss Prize for Translation from the German Academy for Language and Literature
  1989  Grand Order of Merit of the Federal Republic of Germany
  1990  Golden Owl award of the German Socratic Society, for outstanding scholarship
  1992  Dr. Leopold Lucas Prize of the University of Tübingen
 25 October 1996, Order of Merit of the Republic of Turkey
  1996  Egyptian Order of Merit for Art and Science, First Class
  1997  Honorary membership in the Central Council of Muslims in Germany
  2001  Reuchlin Prize of the City of Pforzheim, Germany, for outstanding contributions in the humanities
  2002  Do'stlik Order of the Republic of Uzbekistan, for the promotion of friendship and mutual understanding between nations
  2002  Muhammad Nafi Tschelebi Peace Prize of the Central Islamic Archive Institute of Germany, Soen, a prestigious award for Jewish-Christian-Muslim dialogue
  2005  Name engraved in the "Walk of Fame" street in the City of Bonn

Schimmel also received honorary degrees from three Pakistani universities (Sind, Quaid-i-Azam, and Peshawar), from the Faculty of Theology  at Uppsala University, Sweden (1986), and from Selçuk University in Turkey.

Selected works
Mohammad Iqbal, Poet and Philosopher: A Collection of Translations, Essays, and Other Articles. Karachi: Pakistan-German Forum, 1960.
Islamic Calligraphy. Evanston, Ill.: Adler's Foreign Books, 1970.
Islamic Literatures of India.  Wiesbaden: Otto Harrassowitz Verlag, 1973. .
 Mystical Dimensions of Islam (512 pages). Chapel Hill: University of North Carolina Press, 1975. . 
Classical Urdu Literature: From the Beginning to Iqbal. A History of Indian Literature, v. 8. Wiesbaden: Otto Harrassowitz Verlag, 1975.  .
Pain and Grace: A Study of Two Mystical Writers of Eighteenth-Century Muslim India. Leiden: Brill, 1976. .
 A Dance of Sparks: Imagery of Fire in Ghalib's Poetry. New Delhi: Ghalib Academy, 1979.
We Believe in One God: The Experience of God in Christianity and Islam, edited by Annemarie Schimmel and Abdoldjavad Falaturi; translated by Gerald Blaczszak and Annemarie Schimmel. London: Burns & Oates, 1979.
 The Triumphal Sun: A Study of the Works of Jalaloddinn Rumi.  London: East-West Publications, 1980.
 As Through a Veil: Mystical Poetry in Islam (376 pages). New York: Columbia University Press, 1982. .
Das Mysterium der Zahl (310 pages). Munich: Eugen Diederichs Verlag, 1983. English edition, The Mystery of Numbers (314 pages). New York: Oxford University Press, 1993. .
 And Muhammad Is His Messenger: The Veneration of the Prophet in Islamic Piety (367 pages). Chapel Hill: University of North Carolina Press, 1985. .
 Gabriel's Wing: Study into the Religious Ideas of Sir Muhammad Iqbal. Karachi: Iqbal Academy, 1989. .
Calligraphy and Islamic Culture. New York University Press, 1990. .
Islamic Names: An Introduction (134 pages). Edinburgh University Press, 1990. .
Islam: An Introduction (166 pages). Albany: State University of New York Press, 1992. .
 A Two-Colored Brocade: The Imagery of Persian Poetry. Chapel Hill: University of North Carolina Press, 1992. .
 Deciphering the Signs of God: A Phenomenological Approach to Islam (314 pages). The 1991–1992 Gifford Lectures. Albany: State University of New York Press, 1994. .
Nightingales under the Snow: Poems. London and New York : Khaniqahi Nimatullahi Publications, 1994. .
Anvari's Divan: A Pocket Book for Akbar. New York: Metropolitan Museum of Art, 1994.
Introduction to Cats of Cairo: Egypt's Enduring Legacy, with photographs by Lorraine Chittock. New York: Abbeville Press, 1995. Reissued as Cairo Cats: Egypt's Enduring Legacy (96 pages). American University in Cairo Press, 2005. .
Meine Seele ist eine Frau. Munich: Kosel Verlag, 1995. English translation: My Soul Is a Woman: The Feminine in Islam (192 pages). New York and London: Continuum, 1997. .
 Look! This Is Love. Boston: Shambhala Centaur Editions, 1996. .
I Am Wind, You Are Fire: The Life and Work of Rumi. Boston: Shambhala Publications, 1997. Reissued as Rumi's World : The Life and Works of the Great Sufi Poet. Boston: Shambhala Publications, 2001. .
Im Reich der Grossmoguls: Geschichte, Kunst, Kultur. Munich: Verlag C.H. Beck, 2000. English translation: The Empire of the Great Mughals: History, Art, and Culture (352 pages). London: Reaktion Books, 2004. .
Make a Shield from Wisdom: Selected Verses from Nasir-I Khusraw's Divan (112 pages), translated and introduced by Annemarie Schimmel. London: I.B. Tauris, in association with the International Institute of Ismaili Studies, 2001. .
Islam and the Wonders of Creation: The Animal Kingdom. London: Al-Furqan Islamic Heritage Foundation 2003. .

See also
Malamatiyya
Iranology
Famous Americans in Iran

References

Further reading
 Annemarie Schimmel Festschrift: Essays Presented to Annemarie Schimmel on the Occasion of Her Retirement from Harvard University by Her Colleagues, Students, and Friends (334 pages), edited by Maria Eva Subtelny. Journal of Turkish Studies 18 (1994). Published by the Department of Near Eastern Languages and Civilizations, Harvard University.

External links
Burzine Waghmar, Professor Annemarie Schimmel (April 7, 1922 to January 26, 2003), Journal of the Royal Asiatic Society, 13 (2003): 377–79.
Burzine Waghmar, Annemarie Schimmel, The Guardian, 6 February 2003, p. 24. 
Burzine Waghmar and M. Ikram Chaghatai, Bibliography of the Works of the Scholar-Hermit Prof. Dr. Annemarie Schimmel, ed. M. Suheyl Umar, 3rd ed., Lahore: Iqbal Academy, 2004.
Burzine Waghmar, Annemarie Schimmel: Iqbal and Indo-Muslim Studies, Encyclopædia Iranica, New York: Encyclopædia Iranica Foundation, published online, 16 April 2018.
Burzine Waghmar, Annemarie Schimmel: Bibliography, Encyclopædia Iranica, New York: Encyclopædia Iranica Foundation, published online, 4 May 2018.   
Shusha Guppy, Professor Annemarie Schimmel, The Independent, 30 January 2003.
Leonard Lewisohn, Annemarie Schimmel, The Times, 6 February 2003.

1922 births
2003 deaths
German women academics
German orientalists
Iranologists
Harvard University faculty
Iqbal scholars
German Islamic studies scholars
Recipients of Hilal-i-Imtiaz
Academic staff of the University of Bonn
Academic staff of Ankara University
Recipients of Sitara-i-Imtiaz
German Sindhologists
Commanders Crosses of the Order of Merit of the Federal Republic of Germany
Scholars of Sufism
Members of the Royal Netherlands Academy of Arts and Sciences
Women scholars of Islam
Women orientalists
Translators of Forough Farrokhzad
Writers from Erfurt
Archaeologists from Thuringia
Reich Labour Service members
20th-century German women scientists
20th-century scholars
German expatriates in the United States
German magazine founders
Recipients of the Order of Merit of the Republic of Turkey